St Thomas' Church is the parish church in Osbaldwick, a suburban village to the east of York, in England.

The church was built of limestone in the 12th century.  The nave, chancel, and several round-headed windows date from this period.  The bowl of a 12th-century font also survives, although it is broken and no longer in use.  A window on the south side of the chancel dates was added in about 1300.  Around the nave, the lower part of the wall is panelled, and some panelling dates from the 16th century, while the communion table and pulpit are Jacobean.

The church was heavily restored by John Oldrid Scott in 1877.  In 1967, A. Michael Mennim added a south transept, a new south porch, a vestry, and an organ chamber, giving the church an L-shaped plan.  He moved the Perpendicular east window to the south end of the transept, and made the east end a blank wall.  He also relocated the 12th century south door to the east side of the transept.

In 2005, the church was reordered, with the addition of a kitchen, and the replacement of the pews with chairs.

Mary Ward, founder of the Congregation of Jesus, is buried in the churchyard.  Her gravestone, now in the church's south wall, is inscribed: "To love the poore, persever in the same, live, dy and rise with them was all the ayme of Mary Ward who having lived 60 years and 8 days dyed the 20th of Jan 1641".

The church was Grade II listed in 1953.

References

External links

Osbaldwick
Osbaldwick